Kilgour is a surname of Scottish origin. Notable people with the surname include:

Darris Kilgour(fl. 1992–2014), American lacrosse player and coach
David Kilgour (born 1941), Canadian politician
David Kilgour (musician) (fl. 1978–2014), New Zealand musician (The Clean)
Don Kilgour (born 1946), Australian politician
Fred Kilgour (1914–2006), American librarian
Hamish Kilgour (fl. 1978–2014), New Zealand musician (The Clean)
Joseph Kilgour (1863–1933), Canadian actor
Kirk Kilgour (1947–2002), American volleyball player
Lennox Kilgour (1927–2004), Trinidad & Tobago weightlifter
Niall Kilgour (fl. 1968–2004), British naval officer
Mary Stewart Kilgour (1851–1955), British suffragist and writer
Maggie Kilgour (born 1957), Canadian academic and author
Rab Kilgour (born 1956), Scottish football player
Rich Kilgour (born 1969), American lacrosse player
Robert Kilgour (1714–1790), Scottish Episcopal Church minister

See also
Marc Kilgour, fictional character in the Henderson's Boys series of books
Kilgour, a former church in the parish of Falkland, Fife, Scotland

References

Surnames of Scottish origin